Midi Minuit Fantastique (1962–1972) was a French film magazine published by Eric Losfeld (publisher of Adonis Kyrou and film magazine Positif). Michel Caen and Alain Le Bris started it, accompanied by Jean Boullet and Jean-Claude Romer. The headquarters of Midi Minuit Fantastique was in Paris.

The magazine was dedicated to the fantastique, horror and science fiction films of the 1960s. It had a guide to the Parisian film theatres showing those cultish genres.

Some Midi Minuit Fantastique issues were dedicated to special themes (King Kong, Dracula, The Most Dangerous Game).

In later days, when acceptance of alternative canons of cinema had grown, Midi Minuit Fantastique sometimes dealt with more mainstream subject matter with profiles on Samuel Fuller, Otto Preminger or Federico Fellini.

Literary fiction was also the subject of Midi Minuit, with an essay on Gaston Leroux by Jean Rollin. During its existence the magazine produced a total of twenty-four issues.

See also
 List of film periodicals

References

Etude analytique et sémiologique de Midi minuit fantastique, René Prédal, published by Centre du vingtième siècle de Nice.

1962 establishments in France
1972 disestablishments in France
Defunct magazines published in France
Film magazines published in France
French-language magazines
Magazines established in 1962
Magazines disestablished in 1972
Magazines published in Paris